Bayu Indonesia (Indonesian: PT Bayu Indonesia Air) was an airline in Indonesia. The airline has ceased operating after the airline's licence was frozen.

Codes 
 IATA: DD
 ICAO: BYU
 Airline call sign: BAYU

Aircraft 
Bayu Indonesia had 1 Boeing 707-321, 2 Boeing 737-209 (A), 1 Boeing 737-2Q8 (A) and 2 Canadair CL-44, and 2 DC-6A. Currently, PK-BYA (Boeing 737-209 A) is Kartika Airlines, PK-BYD (Boeing 737-2Q8 A) is Indonesian Air Force, PK-BYX (Boeing 737-209 A) is Transmile Air Service.

References

Defunct airlines of Indonesia